Gardinia magnifica is a moth of the family Erebidae. It was described by Francis Walker in 1865. It is found in Panama, Colombia and Ecuador.

References

 

Lithosiina
Moths described in 1865